Knights of St. George may refer to:

Chivalric orders:
  Order of Saint George, A European Order of the House of Habsburg-Lothringen
 Order of Sant Jordi d'Alfama, founded by King Peter II of Aragon in 1201, amalgamated with the Order of Montesa in 1400
 Order of Saint George (Kingdom of Hungary), established by King Charles of Hungary in 1326
 Order of the Garter, founded by King Edward III of England in 1348, meets annually at St. George's Chapel, Windsor Castle
 Sacred Military Constantinian Order of Saint George, a Roman Catholic order legendarily founded by Constantine the Great, actually established between 1520 and 1545
 Old Order of Saint George, named Order of the Four Emperors, established by Count  Philipp Ferdinand of Limburg-Stirum in 1768

Orders of merit:
 Royal Order of Saint George for the Defense of the Immaculate Conception, founded by Elector Maximilian II Emanuel of Bavaria in 1726
 Order of St. George, founded by Catherine the Great of Russia in 1769
 Order of St Michael and St George, founded by Prince Regent George IV of the United Kingdom in 1818
 Order of St. George (Hanover), founded by King Ernest Augustus I of Hanover in 1839
 Order of Saints George and Constantine, founded by King George II of Greece in 1936
 George Cross and George Medal, founded by King George VI of the United Kingdom in 1940

See also
Order of St. George (disambiguation)
  

fr:Ordre de Saint-Georges